Imamzadeh Ahmad is an imamzadeh in Isfahan, Iran. The Imamzadeh comprises a tomb, to the north and west of which are two iwans; the tomb faces a vast yard where several famous people, like Amir Kabir's daughter and Naser al-Din Shah's sister and wife, are buried. The emamzadeh himself was likely the Sultan Ali's son, who has been buried in Mashhad-e Ardehal.

The stone is placed under a wooden reticulated window  facing alley. It is said, that it is a piece of Somnath stone. About the Somnath stone Jaberi Ansari has written in the history of Isfahan and Rey as follows:

"Mahmud of Ghazni brought a stone as a souvenir from Somnath in India. It is said that it had been a part of the most important idol in that land. This stone was transferred to Isfahan and a century later it was cut in half  and made a stone trough from one half in Vazir Tahmasb school and the other half was dragged on the ground (for demonstrating the abjection of the idol) and then it was taken to emamzadeh Ahmad."

Emamzadeh Ahmad was built in Seljukid era, but the present structure belongs to Safavid age. The ceiling of the mausoleum is covered by Muqarnas works. Around the sepulcher there is a poem in golden Nastaliq script, in which Zellossoltan has mentioned repairments and revampings of this structure by him.

Unlike few decorations of the imamzadeh's tomb, the tomb of Amir Kabir's daughter and Naser al-Din Shah Qajar's sister and wife have been fully decorated with stucco, painting and mirror decoration.

See also 
 List of the historical structures in the Isfahan province

References

External link 

Architecture in Iran
Buildings and structures in Isfahan